Karkhaneh Sefid Kan (also Romanized as Kārkhāneh Sefīd Kan, Kārkhāneh-ye Sefīd Kon, and Kārkhāneh-ye Sefīd Kan; also known as Kārkhāneh, Khārkhāneh, and Kārkhāneh-ye Sālār) is a village in Chalanchulan Rural District, Silakhor District, Dorud County, Lorestan Province, Iran. At the 2006 census, its population was 639, in 155 families.

References 

Towns and villages in Dorud County